Wigton is a market town in the Allerdale borough of Cumbria, England. Historically in Cumberland, it lies just outside the Lake District in the borough of Allerdale. Wigton is at the centre of the Solway Plain, between the Caldbeck Fells and the Solway coast. It is served by Wigton railway station on the Cumbrian Coast Line, and the A596 road to Workington.

Etymology
Wigton is "Wicga's tūn". "Wicga" is an Old English pre-7th-century personal name meaning "a beetle" (as in "earwig"), while "tūn" is Old English for a demarcated plot, a "homestead" or "village", so Wigton is "the hamlet belonging to Wicga".

History
On the River Wampool and Wiza Beck (beck being a dialect word meaning "brook" or "stream" – from the Old Norse bekkr), the market town of Wigton is an ancient settlement and evolved from a pre-medieval street plan, which can still be traced today.

The Romans had a cavalry station, Maglona, known locally as Old Carlisle, just to the south of the town with a large vicus (civilian settlement) associated with it. The fort was approximately half-way between Carlisle and the Roman settlement of Derventio (now known as Papcastle), linked by the Roman road that is now the A595. From this location they could react to incursions from north of Hadrian's Wall, using the Roman road to sally east or west before traversing northward across the countryside.

In the period of late antiquity after Roman rule, Wigton was within the native British kingdom of Rheged. Probably of Anglian origin, Wigton was an established settlement in the Kingdom of Northumbria long before the Normans arrived in the area. Wigton and most of then Cumberland were a part of Scotland in 1086 when the Domesday Book was written for William I, so are not included in it.

The Norman invaders created the County of Carlisle, building Carlisle Castle in Carlisle in 1092 for its administrative centre. Odard de Logis became William II's Sheriff of Carlisle and was made Baron of Wigton about 1100 AD when it became a Norman barony. Wigton gained its market charter in 1262. The de Logis barons changed their surname to de Wigton around 1208 but the male line of the family died out in 1348, so the manor passed to the Barony of Cockermouth. Although the town's layout is generally Anglian or medieval, its architecture is mainly in the 18th-century Georgian style which remains largely intact.

In the middle of Wigton's market place is the George Moore Memorial Fountain built in 1872; of particular interest are the four bronzes around the fountain, the work of the Pre-Raphaelite sculptor Thomas Woolner. These depict the "four acts of mercy". St Mary's Church dates from 1788, but there was a church on this site from the 12th century. (source: 'A New Illustrated History of Wigton')

A private secondary school, the Wigton School (also called the Friends' School or Brookfield) was founded to the north of the town in 1815 with an initial enrolment of eight pupils. After reaching a maximum enrolment of 250 or so in the 1970s and 1980s, the school closed, following sustained drop-off in student numbers and, finally, damage by fire.

The appearance of the church owes much to the vision of Rev John Ford (father of the broadcaster Anna Ford) in the 1950s, when he had gravestones laid flat and the interior painted in the present colours. Highmoor Bell tower, built during the Industrial Revolution and completed in 1887, played tunes three times daily.

Fiddleback Farm
Fiddleback Farm, a Grade II* listed building, is situated approximately 100 yards to the west of the A595. Its site was used, amongst other purposes, for supplying provisions and materials from "Old Carlisle" to Hadrian's Wall. It is thought that the farm site was the first "Mile Station" from Old Carlisle. Regarding Fiddleback, the building was originally fortified to repel invading Celts. It later become a place of worship. Constructed in the shape of a fiddle, it was built about 300 years ago, along with two other buildings in the shape of musical instruments by a wealthy and eccentric land-owner. During renovation works, the skeleton of a cat was discovered above one of the old entrance doorways. Another Grade 2 listed building, constructed in the shape of an accordion, still stands. A third, built in the shape of a banjo, was demolished for unknown reasons in the 1920s.

Geography
Wigton today is a market town, with livestock auctions being held regularly at Hopes Auction Company. The main employer is Innovia Films.

The town has its own secondary school, called The Nelson Thomlinson School, which is a comprehensive with close links to the Innovia factory.

In 2004 the town was the first settlement in the United Kingdom to enforce a curfew on teenagers under the age of 16. It was in place for two weeks, and its aim was to reduce the amount of vandalism in the town centre. It followed nightly vandalism campaigns, which included smashed shop fronts, as well as intimidation of elderly members of the community. The curfew attracted national attention, with the local secondary school receiving visits from agencies such as Sky News. It had some effect, with less vandalism taking place ever since.

Industry
Wigton's principal employer is the Innovia Films Ltd (locally known as The Factory) in the centre of the town. In 1936 the British New Wrap Co Ltd was formed in Wigton, Cumbria, and production of cellulose film began at the site which had previously been a jam-making facility, and then set up to produce "artificial silk" or Rayon. In 1936 the company changed its name to British Rayophane Ltd. The company's main products are:
 Labels and graphics
 Cellophane and Propafilm – bubble-produced BOPP film
 Substrates for plastic banknotes – used for multiple currencies worldwide including the new British polymer banknotes
 Plastic labels – replacing paper labels due to their resistance to tearing, scuffing and water damage. Clear labels are especially popular as they give the 'upmarket' appearance of graphics printed directly onto a bottle or container
 UV-resistant films – for promotional and POS/POP graphics

Wigton is the headquarters of the British National Party.

Notable people
 Richard Bell, cricketer
 Melvyn Bragg, writer and broadcaster was born and lived his early life in the town and, when raised to the peerage, took Lord Bragg of Wigton as his title
 Jarrad Branthwaite, footballer, plays for Everton F.C. 
 Charles Dickens, visited the town, and it was subsequently mentioned in The Two Idle Apprentices
 Anna Ford, broadcaster, was brought up in Wigton
 Thomas Holliday, one of a handful of Dual-code rugby internationals
 William Perry Briggs, Medical Officer of Health to Wigton Rural District Council (188?–1928)
 Robert Smirke, artist, born in Wigton
 Roger Liddle, Baron Liddle, elected to Cumbria County Council for the Wigton Division.

Gallery

See also

Listed buildings in Wigton

References

External links

  Cumbria County History Trust: Wigton (nb: provisional research only – see Talk page)

 
Market towns in Cumbria
Civil parishes in Cumbria
Towns in Cumbria
Allerdale